Ctenomeristis subfuscella is a species of snout moth in the genus Ctenomeristis. It was described by George Hampson in 1901 and is known from Queensland, Australia.

References

Moths described in 1901
Phycitini